Chitra Nodir Pare (known in English as Quiet Flows the River Chitra) is a Bangladeshi Bengali directed by Tanvir Mokammel. It is a feature film on destiny of a Hindu family in East Pakistan. The film won seven national awards including the best film and the best director of the year 1999. Other awards were best Story, best Dialogue, best Art-Director, best Supporting Actress and best Make-up Man. The film was shown in London, Oslo, Fribourg (Switzerland), Singapore, Delhi, Calcutta and Trivandrum film festivals.

Cast
 Momtajuddin Ahmed - Shashikanta Sengupta
 Afsana Mimi - Minoti
 Tauquir Ahmed - Badal
 Rawshan Jamil - Anuprova
 Sumita Devi
 Nazmul Huda

Soundtrack
The music of this film was directed by Syed Shabab Ali Arzoo.

Response 
Film critic Ahmed Muztaba Zamal, writing in Cinemaya in 2000, named Chitra Nodir Pare as one of the top twelve films from Bangladesh.

Awards

See also
 Srabon Megher Din (1999)

References

External links
 
 Chitra Nodir Pare at the Rotten Tomatoes
 Chitra Nodir Pare at the Bangla Movie Database

1999 films
1990s Bengali-language films
Bengali-language Bangladeshi films
Bangladeshi drama films
Films directed by Tanvir Mokammel
Films set in East Pakistan
Best Film National Film Award (Bangladesh) winners
1999 drama films